Bler Thaçi (born 4 August 1999) is a Kosovar professional footballer who plays as a midfielder for KEK.

Club career
Thaçi gained recognition in 2013 as the "best under-15 player in Kosovo". He began training with Galatasaray S.K in January 2014. He defected from KF KEK to KF Besa Kavajë in January 2018 alongside compatriot Fatjon Bushati, who joined from KF Ballkani. He returned to KEK in December 2019.

Personal life 
Thaçi is named after former British prime minister Tony Blair.

Career statistics

Club

Notes

References

1999 births
Living people
Sportspeople from Podujevo
Kosovan footballers
Association football midfielders
KF KEK players
Besa Kavajë players
Football Superleague of Kosovo players
Kategoria e Parë players
Kosovan expatriate footballers
Expatriate footballers in Albania
Kosovan expatriate sportspeople in Albania